DuPage Township is located in Will County, Illinois. As of the 2010 census, its population was 87,793 and it contained 28,861 housing units making it the most populous township in the county.  Like the county of the same name which it borders on the north, this township is named after the DuPage River.

Geography

Cities, Towns, Villages
 Bolingbrook (vast majority)
 Lemont (small portion)
 Lockport (small portion)
 Naperville (southeast quarter)
 Plainfield (small portion)
 Romeoville (half)
 Woodridge (small portion)

Unincorporated Towns
 Barbers Corners at 
 Romeo at 
 Welco Corners at

Demographics

References

External links
City-data.com
Will County Official Site
Illinois State Archives

1849 establishments in Illinois
Populated places established in 1849
Townships in Will County, Illinois
Townships in Illinois